James B. Harris (born August 3, 1928) is an American film screenwriter, producer, and director. Born in New York City, he attended the Juilliard School before entering the film industry. He worked with film director Stanley Kubrick as a producer on The Killing (1956), Paths of Glory (1957), and Lolita (1962). Harris' directorial debut was the Cold War thriller The Bedford Incident (1965). He also directed the actor James Woods in two films: the prison-guard drama Fast-Walking (1982) with actress Kay Lenz, and the thriller Cop (1988), based on a James Ellroy novel, which Woods co-produced. Harris also directed the 1993 thriller Boiling Point.

The Turner Classic Movies website describes Harris as a "veteran Hollywood industry figure who has served triple duty as a producer, director, and screenwriter". A 2002 interview between Harris and Hollywood Five-O includes discussion of his works as well as of Kubrick, Marlon Brando, Laurence Olivier, Lolita, and various other topics. It includes photos of Harris and screencaps of Kirk Douglas, Sue Lyon (who portrayed Lolita), James Mason, and Peter Sellers. His brother was the composer J. Robert Harris.

Filmography

References

External links 

1928 births
Living people
American screenwriters
American film directors
American film producers
Bryna Productions people